Mitochondrial import inner membrane translocase subunit Tim22 is an enzyme that in humans is encoded by the TIMM22 gene.

See also
 Mitochondria Inner Membrane Translocase
 TIMM17A
 TIMM23
 TIMM44

References

Further reading

Mitochondrial proteins